Wanya Marçal-Madivadua (born 19 October 2002) is a Portuguese professional footballer currently playing as a midfielder for Leicester City.

Career
On 8 January 2022, Marçal-Madivadua made his first professional debut with Leicester City in a 4–1 FA Cup win over Watford, coming on as a late sub. On 22 February 2022, he signed a professional contract with Leicester City.

International career
Born in Portugal, Marçal-Madivadua is of Cape Verdean and Mozambican descent. He is a youth international for Portugal, having represented the Portugal U20s.

Career statistics

Club
.

References

External links

2002 births
Living people
Footballers from Porto
Footballers from Leicester
Portuguese footballers
Portugal youth international footballers
Portuguese people of Angolan descent
Portuguese people of Mozambican descent
Association football midfielders
Leicester City F.C. players
Portuguese expatriate footballers
Portuguese expatriates in England
Expatriate footballers in England